Taverne is a surname. Notable people with the surname include:

Dick Taverne (born 1928), British politician
Joost Taverne (born 1971), Dutch politician
Michaël Taverne (born 1979), French politician
Omer Taverne (1904–1981), Belgian cycle racer

See also
Laverne (name)
Tavern
Taverna